Tereshky is a municipality and village in Poltava Raion, Poltava Oblast, Ukraine. The village itself has a population of 2,450 (2001) while the municipality consisting of two villages (Tereshky and Kopyly) has 4,742 inhabitants (2005).

The village is located 4 km southeast of Poltava on the railway line Poltava—Kremenchuk. It lies near Vorskla river.

External links
 Tereshky at the Verkhovna Rada of Ukraine site

Villages in Poltava Raion